Janusz Tyszkiewicz may refer to:

 Janusz Skumin Tyszkiewicz, 1570–1642, voivode of Mścisław (1621–1626), Trakai (1626–1640), and Vilnius (1640–1642)
 Janusz Tyszkiewicz Łohojski, 1590–1649, voivode of Kiev